Elizabethtown High School is located in Elizabethtown, Kentucky, United States. A part of Elizabethtown Independent Schools (EIS), it is commonly referred to as E'Town High School or EHS.

Elizabethtown High School ranked #7 in the state on the 2009 spring exam.

The school has a population of 775 students and employs about 50 teachers.
Thad Elmore has been the principal since July 1, 2021.

Through the 2019–20 school year, it served high school students in West Point, and therefore was a feeder high school of the West Point Independent School District, which only covered grades K–8. This arrangement ended on July 1, 2020 when the West Point district merged into Hardin County Schools (HCS). West Point students already enrolled at EHS will be allowed to continue their education there; future West Point high school students will attend North Hardin High School.

Education system
The school runs on "period" scheduling. There are six one-hour periods of class per day. Lunch is taken during fourth period and there are three rotations of lunch.

Students must acquire four credits before graduation. EHS is on the traditional semester class rotation where it stresses the mastery of basic skills. EHS offers the opportunity to seniors to take dual credit classes at Elizabethtown Community and Technical College.

Athletics

The Elizabethtown Panthers and Lady Panthers represent the school and have won 14 state championships.

The school's main rivals are the three high schools operated by HCS—Central Hardin High School, located within the Elizabethtown city limits but outside the EIS boundary; John Hardin High School, located in a part of neighboring Radcliff served by the Elizabethtown post office; and North Hardin High School, also in Radcliff.

References

External links

Schools in Hardin County, Kentucky
Public high schools in Kentucky
Elizabethtown, Kentucky